Idappaccayatā (Pali, also idappaccayata; Sanskrit: idaṃpratyayatā) is a Buddhist term that is translated as "specific conditionality" or "this/that conditionality". It refers to the principle of causality: that all things arise and exist due to certain causes (or conditions), and cease once these causes (or conditions) are removed. This principle is expressed in the following simple formula that is repeated hundreds of times in the Buddhist discourses:

Idappaccayatā (specific conditionality), as expressed in the above formula, is identified as a key expression of the doctrine of pratītyasamutpāda (dependent origination).

Etymology
The Pali term idappaccayatā, is composed of three Pali words: ida, paccaya and tā. Translator Patrick Kearney explains these terms as follows:

Ven. Dhammanando provides the following explanation:

Alternate translations
The following English terms are used as translations for this term:
 Causality (Ajahn  Brahmavamso)
 Specific causality - U Thittila (Book of Analysis)
 Specifically assignable causality - Pe Maung Tin (The Expositor)
 Conditionality - Jeffrey Hopkins (Tibetan, Sanskrit, English Dictionary)
 This/that conditionality - Thanissaro Bhikkhu
 Specific conditionality - Ajahn Payutto; Bodhi/Ñāṇamoli (Connected Discourses, Middle Length Discourses etc.)
 Convergence of conditional factors - Ajahn Payutto
 Having just these conditions - Jeffrey Hopkins
 The conditioned nature of things - Maurice Walshe (Long Discourses)
 This conditioned-ness - Patrick Kearney

Expression of pratītyasamutpāda
Idappaccayatā (this/that conditionality), as expressed in the this/that formula, is identified as a key expression of the doctrine of pratītyasamutpāda (dependent origination).
 Thich Nhat Hanh states: "The Buddha expressed interdependent co-arising very simply: "This is, because that is. This is not, because that is not. This comes to be, because that comes to be. This ceases to be, because that ceases to be." These sentences occur hundreds of times in both the Northern and Southern transmissions. They are the Buddhist genesis."
 Peter Harvey states: In its abstract form, the doctrine states: "That being, this comes to be; from the arising of that, this arises; that being absent, this is not; from the cessation of that, this ceases." (S.II.28) This states the principle of conditionality, that all things, mental and physical, arise and exist due to the presence of certain conditions, and cease once their conditions are removed: nothing (except Nibbana) is independent.
 Christina Feldman states: "The basic principle of dependent origination is simplicity itself. The Buddha described it by saying: 'When there is this, that is. / With the arising of this, that arises. / When this is not, neither is that. / With the cessation of this, that ceases.' When all of these cycles of feeling, thought, bodily sensation, all of these cycles of mind and body, action, and movement, are taking place upon a foundation of ignorance — that’s called samsara.
 Joseph Goldstein states: "At the heart of his teaching is the principle of dependent origination: because of this, that arises; when this ceases, that also ceases. The law of dependent origination is central to understanding not only the arising of our precious human birth, but also the unfolding process of life itself, in all its pain and beauty."
 Rupert Gethin: "Another succinct formula states the principle of causality (idaṃpratyayatā) as ‘this existing, that exists; this arising, that arises; this not existing, that does not exist; this ceasing, that ceases’. (Majjhima Nikāya iii. 63; Samyutta Nikāya v. 387; etc.) ...the succinct formula state[s] baldly that the secret of the universe lies in the nature of causality — the way one thing leads to another.

Equivalence to pratītyasamutpāda
Ajahn Payutto describes idappaccayatā as another name for pratītyasamutpāda. Ajahn Payutto provides the following quote from the Pali sutta S. II. 25-6:

Direct experience
The Access to Insight glossary emphasizes that idappaccayatā relates to direct experience. The glossary states:
 This name for the causal principle the Buddha discovered on the night of his Awakening stresses the point that, for the purposes of ending suffering and stress, the processes of causality can be understood entirely in terms of forces and conditions that are experienced in the realm of direct experience, with no need to refer to forces operating outside of that realm.

This/that formula

Translations of this/that formula
There are many translations of the idappaccayatā formula by contemporary scholars and translators. 

Contemporary translator Thanissaro Bikkhu provides the following translation:

Rupert Gethin translates it as follows:

Analysis
Thanissaro Bhikkhu analyzes the meaning of the this/that formula as follows:

Notes

References

Web references

Sources

External links
 Access to Insight glossary
 Refuge, by Thanissaro Bhikkhu
 Wings to Awakening, by Thanissaro Bhikkhu
 This is how I heard it, by Patrick Kearney
 Dhamma Wheel - Idappaccayatā
 Significance of Dependent Origination, by Ajahn Payutto
 Paticca Samuppada - Dependent Origination, by Ajahn Brahmavamso

Buddhist philosophical concepts
Causality